Butterfly Knoll is one of the La Grange Nunataks, located  southwest of Mount Beney in the Shackleton Range. It was photographed from the air by the U.S. Navy, 1967, and surveyed by the British Antarctic Survey, 1968–71. It was named by the UK Antarctic Place-Names Committee from its resemblance in plan view to a butterfly.

References 

Nunataks of Coats Land